McKendree University (McK) is a private university in Lebanon, Illinois. Founded in 1828 as the Lebanon Seminary, it is the oldest college or university in Illinois. McKendree enrolls approximately 2,300 undergraduates and nearly 700 graduate students representing 25 countries and 29 states. In the undergraduate program, on average there are 51% females and 49% males. The institution remains affiliated with the United Methodist Church. The school was renamed McKendree University beginning in the 2007–08 academic year. McKendree University comprises a College of Arts and Science, a School of Business, a School of Health Professions, and a School of Education.

History
Established by pioneer Methodists, McKendree is the oldest university in the state of Illinois and continues to have ties to the United Methodist Church. First called Lebanon Seminary, the school opened in two rented sheds for 72 students in 1828 under Edward Raymond Ames. In 1830, Bishop William McKendree, the first American-born bishop of the Methodist church, permitted the board of trustees to change the institution's name to McKendree College. Later Bishop McKendree deeded  of land in Shiloh, Illinois to endow the college. Reverend Peter Akers, in 1833, was the first president of the newly named college. He was president of McKendree College three times and received its first degree, an honorary Doctorate of Divinity. In 1835, the college received one of the first charters granted to independent church colleges by the Illinois legislature. The institution still operates under the provisions of a second, more liberal charter obtained in 1839.

Since 1994 and the installation of its former President Dr. James M. Dennis, the institution has significantly increased its enrollment. In recent years, a new enrollment management strategy has yielded larger numbers of high quality students, built substantial graduate enrollments and strongly diversified the student body. In 2001, the college embarked on a capital campaign which raised more than $20 million for the campus including the creation of a performing arts center.

Academics
McKendree University confers degrees from four colleges and schools and offers over 50 undergraduate majors, 45 minors, and master's degrees in four areas: business administration, criminal justice, education, nursing, and clinical mental health counseling. McKendree also offers a doctoral program in education, with the opportunity for teachers and administrators to earn a specialist degree. The university is classified as Master's Colleges and Universities (Master's/L) by the Carnegie Classification of Institutions of Higher Education.

In 2015, U.S. News & World Report's 2015 "Best Colleges" edition ranks McKendree University in the top tier of Midwest regional universities. In addition, McKendree has full accreditation from the Higher Learning Commission (HLC) of the North Central Association of Colleges and Schools. McKendree has been fully accredited by the North Central Association of the Higher Learning Commission since 1915 and received its ten-year renewal in 2003–2004. McKendree's School of Education is fully accredited by the National Council for Accreditation of Teacher Education (NCATE). McKendree's School of Nursing and Health Professionals is accredited by the Commission on Collegiate Nursing Education (CCNE).

The university offers associate degrees, bachelor's degrees, master's degrees, and a doctoral degree through its four schools:

 College of Arts and Sciences
 School of Business
 School of Education
 School of Nursing and Health Professions

More than 50% of the classes have fewer than 14 students. McKendree's student-to-faculty ratio is 14 to 1. More than 90% of the faculty have earned a Ph.D. or higher.

McKendree University is host to chapters representing a number of honor societies and academic fraternities including:

Alpha Phi Omega
Alpha Psi Omega
Alpha Kappa Delta
Iota Tau Alpha
Kappa Delta Pi
Kappa Kappa Psi
Kappa Sigma Tau
Lambda Pi Eta
Nursing Honor Society
Phi Alpha Theta
Phi Beta Lambda
Phi Eta Sigma
Phi Kappa Phi
Pi Gamma Mu
Pi Kappa Delta
Pi Sigma Alpha
Psi Chi
Sigma Beta Delta
Sigma Tau Delta
Sigma Zeta
Upsilon Pi Epsilon

Lebanon campus
McKendree University's main campus is located on a wooded  in Lebanon, Illinois, about 25 minutes from downtown St. Louis, Missouri.

The campus is laid out in roughly a rectangle bordered by Stanton Street and College Hill Cemetery to the west and Monroe St. to the east. North Alton St. and Summerfield St. bisect the campus and are the main roads for vehicular traffic on campus.

The university opened the Russel E. and Fern M. Hettenhausen Center for the Arts (the Hett) in September 2006. The $10 million,  theater includes practice and storage space for the McKendree University band, choral department and faculty offices. The Hett includes a full-size stage with a 500-seat auditorium.

The Marion K. Piper Academic Center (PAC) is the student union, which is the center of the campus, with the library located directly to the northwest of it. All academic buildings are located in the southwestern sections of the campus.

Residence halls
Student housing is provided along the north-central and northeastern areas of the campus. McKendree offers three different types of residence halls: traditional dorm style, suite style, and apartment style. Traditional-style halls are predominantly freshmen and are co-ed by floor. The residence halls are served by the Ames Dining Hall, located between Baker Hall and Walton Hall.

Traditional style halls:
 Baker Hall
 Barnett Hall
 Walton Hall

Suite-style halls:
 Residence Hall East
 Residence Hall West
 The Suites

Apartment-style halls:
 McKendree West
 University Commons
 Triplex
 Hunter Street

The suite-style and apartment-style halls are predominantly upperclassmen; freshmen are not allowed to live in McKendree West Apartments. Suite-style residence halls are located in a 70-student complex on the eastern edge of campus called The Suites. The suites are co-ed by suite and include three bedrooms, one bathroom, and a common area. McKendree West Apartments are the university-owned apartment-style residence housing option. McKendree West houses approximately 380 students and is co-ed by apartment. They are located a half mile from the main campus. The university offers a shuttle service to transport residents to and from McKendree West, called the Bogey Bus named after McKendree's mascot, Bogey the Bearcat.

On October 23, 2010, the university held a groundbreaking ceremony for two new residence halls. The new  residence halls are designed in a modern glass-and-brick style of architecture to blend with other modern buildings on campus as well as the many historic brick buildings. Each new hall is a three-story structure connected by a two-floor glass bridge. The new residence halls tentatively named "New Residence Hall: East" and "New Residence Hall: West" were completed in time for the 2011–2012 academic year. Due to this addition, McKendree University was able to recruit their largest first-year enrollment in 185 years: class of 2017.

Athletics

The McKendree athletic teams are called the Bearcats. The university is a member of NCAA Division II, after completing the transitioning process from the National Association of Intercollegiate Athletics (NAIA) in July 2013. The university competed as an Independent during the 2011–12 academic year (in NCAA D-II play) before becoming a member of the Great Lakes Valley Conference (GLVC) for the 2012–13 academic year as a provisional NCAA member.

In addition to GLVC sponsored sports, McKendree also fields NCAA-sanctioned teams in women's bowling as an independent program and men's volleyball at the National Collegiate (Division I/II) level in the Midwestern Intercollegiate Volleyball Association (MIVA). The women's bowling team won the 2017 NCAA National Collegiate Bowling Championship. They were runner-up in the 2018 event. The school also fields teams outside of the NCAA structure in two NCAA-sponsored sports and four non-NCAA sports. In the NCAA sports of men's ice hockey and women's lacrosse, McKendree is respectively a member of the ACHA Division II in the Mid-American Collegiate Hockey Association (MACHA) and the Western Intercollegiate Lacrosse Association (WILA). The non-NCAA sports sponsored by McKendree are men's and women's bowling, men's and women's powerlifting, and co-ed bass fishing.

Prior to joining the NCAA, McKendree was a member of the Illinois Intercollegiate Athletic Conference (IIAC) from 1912–13 to 1937–38. They were in the NAIA as members of the American Midwest Conference (with the exception of football where they played in the Midwest League of the Mid-States Football Association (MSFA)) from 1987–88 to 2010–11.

McKendree competes in 39 intercollegiate varsity sports: Men's sports include baseball, basketball, bowling, cross country, football, golf, ice hockey (DI and DII), powerlifting, rugby, soccer, swimming & diving, tennis, track & field (indoor and outdoor), volleyball, water polo and wrestling; while women's sports include basketball, beach volleyball, bowling, cross country, golf, ice hockey, lacrosse, powerlifting, rugby, soccer, softball, swimming & diving, tennis, track & field (indoor and outdoor), volleyball, water polo and wrestling; and co-ed sports include bass fishing, cheerleading and dance.

Move to NCAA Division II
On July 12, 2010, the university was informed by the NCAA Division II Membership Committee that it was accepted into the NCAA Division II. McKendree continued to play in the NAIA during the two-year candidacy period, before it became a member of the GLVC during the provisional year. The fourth academic year, 2013–2014, the NCAA would vote to make McKendree an active member of NCAA D-II.

On October 6, 2010, it was announced that McKendree University received and accepted an invitation to the GLVC. The Bearcats became the 17th member of the GLVC in 2012. The university is now eligible for all conference and NCAA championships.

McKendree Worldwide
McKendree University also has campuses in Radcliff, Kentucky, classes online, classes at Scott Air Force Base, and nursing bachelors and masters programs at several locations in Southern Illinois.

The Center at Scott Air Force Base
The Center at Scott Air Force Base is offered on-base for military personnel. Students can pursue an undergraduate degree while taking one-month classes to meet the busy and changing schedule for the service men and women.

Kentucky campus
McKendree University also has a campus located in Radcliff. Programs at this location are structured to provide convenience for working adults who want to pursue an associate degree in Business Administration; a bachelor's degree in Business Administration, Marketing, Accounting, Management, Human Resources Management, Computer Information Systems, Information Technology, or Nursing; or a master's degree in Business Administration or Nursing.

Online
McKendree University offers undergraduate and graduate degrees in an online format. These programs have been designed to provide the quality McKendree experience to those who are unable to attend one of our campuses or off-campus locations. Bachelor's degrees include Business Administration, Nursing and Psychology.

Nursing
McKendree University offers three nursing programs at locations throughout Illinois and Kentucky, as well as online course options. These programs include the RN to Bachelor of Science in Nursing (BSN) Completion Program, the Master of Science in Nursing (MSN) Program (Population Health, Nurse Education and Nurse Administrator/Manager), and the Doctor of Nursing Practice in Ethical Leadership (DNP).

Annual all-campus events
 February: Founder's Day
 April: Spring Fling, Academic Excellence Celebration
 May: Commencement
 June: Bearcat Golf Tournament
 August: New Student Orientation, Convocation
 September: Football Home Opener and Tailgate Party, Fall Family Weekend
 October: Homecoming
 November: Amesgiving
 December: Holiday Tree Lighting

Alumni
 Matt Cole, professional football player
 William Hyde (journalist), 1836-1898
 Andrew Sanchez (Sociology), professional Mixed Martial Artist, formerly in the UFC
 Lanece Clarke Bahamian Olympian

References

External links

 Official website
 Official athletics website
 The McKendree Review - Student-run campus newspaper

 
Buildings and structures in St. Clair County, Illinois
Education in St. Clair County, Illinois
Education in the Metro East
Educational institutions established in 1828
1828 establishments in Illinois
Liberal arts colleges in Illinois
Universities and colleges in Louisville, Kentucky
Tourist attractions in St. Clair County, Illinois
Universities and colleges affiliated with the Methodist Episcopal Church
Private universities and colleges in Illinois
Private universities and colleges in Kentucky